The Racovița is a left tributary of the river Olt in Romania. It discharges into the Olt in the city Făgăraș.

References

Rivers of Romania
Rivers of Brașov County